Protomelas spilopterus is a species of cichlid endemic to Lake Malawi.  It is believed to be a specialist predator on fish fry.  This species can reach a length of  TL.  It can also be found in the aquarium trade.

References

Protomelas
Fish described in 1935
Taxonomy articles created by Polbot
Taxobox binomials not recognized by IUCN